Saussay may refer to the following communes in France:

Saussay, Eure-et-Loir, in the Eure-et-Loir département 
Saussay, Seine-Maritime, in the Seine-Maritime département
Saussay-la-Campagne, in the Eure département 
La Saussaye, in the Eure département

See also

Saussey (disambiguation)